Diwana railway station is a small railway station in Panipat district, Haryana. Its code is DWNA. It serves Diwana village. The station consists of two platform. The platform is not well sheltered. Station serves nearest villages Sewah, Diwana, Garhi Pasina, Jhattipur and Khalila.

See also
 2007 Samjhauta Express bombings

References 

Delhi railway division
Railway stations in Panipat district
2007 Samjhauta Express bombings